The western long-tongued bat (Glossophaga morenoi) is a species of bat in the family Phyllostomidae. It is endemic to southern Mexico, from Chiapas in the southeast to Tlaxcala in the northeast and Michoacán in the west. It ranges over tropical dry forest, shrubland, and dry pine–oak forests, typically from sea level to 300 meters elevation and occasionally up to 1500 meters elevation. It inhabits caves, tree hollows, culverts, wells, and buildings.

References

Glossophaga
Endemic mammals of Mexico
Bats of Mexico
Mammals described in 1938
Taxonomy articles created by Polbot
Fauna of the Sierra Madre del Sur
Balsas dry forests
Fauna of the Southern Pacific dry forests